The following teams and players took part in the women's volleyball tournament at the 1968 Summer Olympics, in Mexico City.

Rosters

Anna Mifková
 Elena Moskalová-Poláková
 Eva Široká
 Hana Vlasáková
 Hilda Mazúrová
 Irena Tichá
 Jitka Senecká
 Júlia Bendeová
 Karla Šašková
 Pavlína Štefková
 Věra Hrabáková
 Věra Štruncová
Head coach

Setsuko Yosjida
 Suzue Takayama
 Toyoko Iwahara
 Youko Kasahara
 Aiko Onozawa
 Yukiyo Kojima
 Sachiko Fukanaka
 Kunie Shishikura
 Setsuko Inoue
 Sumie Oinuma
 Makiko Furakawa
 Keiko Hama
Head coach

Alicia Cárdeñas
 Blanca García
 Carolina Mendoza
 Eloisa Cabada
 Gloria Casales
 Gloria Inzua
 Isabel Nogueira
 María Rodríguez
 Patricia Nava
 Rogelia Romo
 Trinidad Macías
 Yolanda Reynoso
Head coach

Aida Reyna
 Alicia Sánchez
 Ana María Ramírez
 Esperanza Jiménez
 Irma Cordero
 Luisa Fuentes
 Norma Velarde
 Olga Asato
 Teresa Nuñez
 Felicitas Arroyo
 Mercedes González
Head coach
 Akira Kato (JAP)

Elżbieta Porzec
 Zofia Szczęśniewska
 Wanda Wiecha
 Barbara Niemczyk
 Krystyna Ostromęcka
 Krystyna Krupa
 Jadwiga Książek
 Józefa Ledwig
 Krystyna Jakubowska
 Lidia Chmielnicka
 Krystyna Czajkowska
 Halina Aszkiełowicz
Head coach
 Benedykt Krysik

An Gyeong-ja
 Hwang Gyu-ok
 Kim Yeong-Ja
 Kim Oe-sun
 Lee Eun-ok
 Lee Hyang-sim
 Moon Kyung-Sook
 Park Geum-suk
 Seo Hui-suk
 Yang Jin-su
 Kwack Yong-Ja
Head coach

Lyudmila Buldakova
 Lyudmila Mikhailkovskaya
 Tatyana Veinberga
 Vera Lantratova
 Vera Galushka-Duyunova
 Tatyana Sarycheva
 Tatyana Ponyaeva-Tretyakova
 Nina Smoleeva
 Inna Ryskal
 Galina Leontyeva
 Roza Salikhova
 Valentina Kamenek-Vinogradova
Head coach
 Givi Akhvlediani

Patti Bright
 Kathryn Ann Heck
 Fanny Hopeau
 Ninja Jorgensen
 Laurie Lewis
 Miki McFadden
 Marilyn McReavy
 Nancy Owen
 Barbara "Bobbie" Perry
 Mary Perry
 Sharon Peterson
 Jane Ward (c)
Head coach
 Harlan Cohen

References

1968